The BK XXL line of sandwiches is a family of larger, 1/2 pound double cheeseburgers sold by the international fast-food restaurant chain Burger King in the European and Middle Eastern markets. It is one of their late-teen to young-adult male-oriented products.

Product variants
 BK XXL double cheeseburger
 BK XXL bacon double cheeseburger
 Big King XXL
 BK XXL Mushroom and Swiss double has sautéed mushrooms and Emmental cheese-based processed cheese (US colloquialism for Emmental is Swiss cheese). Sold in the Middle East.

Promotional variants 
 Grill Pepper XXL with pepperjack cheese, red onions, lettuce, and a spicy sauce. Sold in the Netherlands.
 Grill Steakhouse XXL with spiced onion sticks, (onion strings), steak sauce, and American cheese. Sold in the Netherlands and Germany.
 Cheesy Bacon XXL with American cheese, pepper jack cheese, a cheese sauce, tomatoes, and bacon. Sold in Germany.

Aliases and international naming 
 In the UK and Ireland it is called the BK XL.
 In Australia where the Hungry Jack's brand name is used instead of BK, the XL range is available in three sizes; XL (two patties), XXL (three patties) and XXXL (four patties.)

History

Advertising
The ads for the XXL bacon double cheeseburger described the XXL as a Whopper "with two enormous portions of flame-broiled meat that will give you all the energy you need to take the world by storm," and used the tag line of "It's awful being a vegetarian, right?". The ad campaign drew the ire of the Spanish government due to the large portion size of these products being in direct opposition to the country's health initiatives.

The German ad program for the Cheesy Bacon XXL featured an edited version of the Manthem commercial used for the Texas Double Whopper. The line mentioning the Whopper was edited out and replaced and the picture of the product was digitally replaced with one of the Cheesy Bacon XXL. The ad was sung entirely in English; all signage, including road signs license plates on vehicles, etc., was not translated into German.

See also 
 Whopper
 BK Stacker
 Big King

Similar sandwiches at other fast food restaurants:
 McDonald's Big Mac

References

Burger King foods
Fast food hamburgers